The 2018 NHRA Mello Yello Drag Racing Season was announced on June 6, 2017.

It was the 63rd season of the National Hot Rod Association's top drag racing competition. There were 24 Top Fuel, Funny Car, and Pro Stock events, and 16 Pro Stock Motorcycle events.

Schedule

* Finals televised on tape delay.  Ennis, TX race broadcast schedule and channel changed from FS2 to FS1 because of 2018 National League Division Series presented by Doosan Game 3 start times.

Additional Rules for Specially Marked Races
4 Lanes:  The Four-Wide Nationals in both Las Vegas and Charlotte in the spring will compete with cars on four lanes.
 All cars will qualify on each lane as all four lanes will be used in qualifying.
 Three rounds with cars using all four lanes.
 In Rounds One and Two, the top two drivers (of four) will advance to the next round.
 The pairings are set as follows:
 Race One:  1, 8, 9, 16
 Race Two:  4, 5, 12, 13
 Race Three:  2, 7, 10, 15
 Race Four:  3, 6, 11, 14
 Semifinal One:  Top two in Race One and Race Two
 Semifinal Two:  Top two in Race Three and Race Four
 Finals:  Top two in Semifinal One and Semifinal Two
 Lane choice determined by times in previous round.  In first round, lane choice determined by fastest times.
 Drivers who advance in Rounds One and Two will receive 20 points for each round advancement.
 In Round Three, the winner of the race will be declared the race winner and will collect 40 points.  The runner-up will receive 20 points.  Third and fourth place drivers will be credited as semifinal losers.

1.5:  The U. S. Nationals and Auto Club Finals will have their race points increased by 50% .  Drivers who qualify but are eliminated in the first round receive 30 points, and each round win is worth 30 points.  The top four receive 10, 9, 8, and 7 points, respectively, for qualifying positions, with the 5–6 drivers receiving 6 points, 7–8 drivers receiving 5 points, 9–12 receiving 4 points, and 13–16 receiving 3 points.  Also, the top four, not three, drivers after each session receive points for fastest times in each round (4-3-2-1).

Event changes
On January 16, 2018, Old Bridge Township Raceway Park in Englishtown, New Jersey ceased all drag racing operations at the facility due to ongoing safety concerns as well as rising maintenance costs. Two weeks later, the NHRA Summernationals, already scheduled to take place there in June, was announced to be moved to Virginia Motorsports Park in Petersburg, Virginia.  The last NHRA professional event at VMP had taken place in 2009.

Because of a series of Monster Energy NASCAR Cup Series date changes, the NHRA changed the dates of numerous rounds to avoid conflicts.  The race in Joliet was moved to early June, as the normal date had been reassigned to the NASCAR meeting at the nearby Chicagoland Speedway, and the Countdown dates in Reading and Charlotte were swapped since the Charlotte date would have been too close to the NASCAR road course playoff race.

2: Due to inclement weather throughout the day, Final Elimination Rounds at the Menards NHRA Heartland Nationals in Topeka, Kansas did not start until around 7 PM CDT on May 20, 2018. After fog began settling in during the second round of pro racing, it was postponed until the following day at 10 AM CDT when the semifinal and final rounds were held.

Final standings

References

External links
 Official website
 Drag Race Central The Latest NHRA News and Analysis

NHRA Camping World Drag Racing Series
2018 in American motorsport